Parking Panda was an online parking service that allowed drivers to find and reserve parking in advance. In addition to providing drivers with mobile and web applications to find parking, they also helped parking garage owners manage their inventory. Parking Panda was headquartered in Baltimore, Maryland.

In April 2017, SpotHero acquired Parking Panda. The acquisition expanded SpotHero into Canada, and brought the number of parking locations the combined company can reserve to over 5,000. Parking Panda maintained a separate reservation system and app for some time after that but the service was eventually sunsetted in favor of SpotHero.

History 
Nick Miller and Adam Zilberbaum founded Parking Panda at the first Maryland Startup Weekend in 2011.

After taking first place at Maryland Startup Weekend, Miller and Zilberbaum were accepted into the inaugural ER Accelerator Summer 2011 program in New York City. During the program, they built out their first online and mobile platform that allows drivers to reserve daily parking. They later added monthly and event parking at private garages, lots and valets.

Services 
Coupled with their online reservation platform, Parking Panda also provided a free iOS and Android mobile application, and a Windows desktop application.

Parking Panda also provided a platform for owners to manage their parking operations.

Partnerships 
In addition to partnering with garage owners, Parking Panda partnered with companies, events, and venues. Notable partnerships included Amtrak, MLB.com, professional sports teams, the Target Center, and the Verizon Center.

Media coverage 
Parking Panda has been featured by major publications including the New York Times, Wall Street Journal, Mashable, Slate, and Tech Crunch.

References

External links
 ParkingPanda.com

Companies based in Baltimore
Online services
American companies established in 2011
2011 establishments in Maryland
Internet properties established in 2011
Transport companies established in 2011
2017 mergers and acquisitions
Parking companies